Julius Freund (18 April 1869 in Cottbus – 11 March 1941 in Wigton, Borough of Allerdale, United Kingdom) was a German entrepreneur and art collector persecuted by the Nazis because he was Jewish.

Life 
The Cottbus-born textile manufacturer Julius Freund lived with his wife Clara, née Dresel, in Berlin. In 1908 their daughter Gisela was born, who became a well-known photographer.

Art collection 
Julius Freund built up an important art collection, which mainly comprised German paintings, drawings and prints from the 19th and 20th centuries. In 1929 Max Schlichting initiated the exhibition “Hundred Years of Berlin Art”, which mainly consisted of Julius Freund's collection.

Nazi persecution 
When the Nazis rose to power in Germany in January 1933, the Freund family was persecuted because of their Jewish origins. The Freund's daughter Gisèle emigrated to Paris and Freund tried to move his art collection to safety. On 1 September 1933 Freund moved his art collection - consisting of 383 paintings, drawings and etchings - from Berlin to the Kunstmuseum Winterthur. A total of 415 works of art from the Julius Freund Collection were brought to the Kunstmuseum Winterthur..

On 18 February 1939, Julius and Clara Freund managed to emigrate to Great Britain. The Reichsführer SS Heinrich Himmler confiscated their property that remained in Germany. Julius Freund died in exile in England in 1941.

What remains of the Julius Freund Collection 
To survive, Clara Freund was forced to sell the art collection located in Switzerland. Art dealer Fritz Nathan organized the sale.

On 21 March 1942, the Julius Freund collection was auctioned off in the infamous Fischer Gallery in Lucerne. The foreword to the auction catalog was written by the daughter Gisela, who now lives in Buenos Aires. In it she stated: "My father, Julius Freund, collected decades and always only from the point of view of artistic value, never in the thought of monetary exploitation". At the same point it is pointed out that it was previously the intention of the collector to "bequeath his artistic possessions ... to a museum". This museum could have been the Märkisches Museum in Berlin. The catalog included larger groups of works by Fritz Boehle, Carl Blechen, Daniel Chodowiecki, Lovis Corinth, Caspar David Friedrich, Theodor Hosemann, Käthe Kollwitz, Franz Krüger, Max Liebermann, Hans von Marées, Adolph von Menzel, Max Slevogt, Hans Thoma and Heinrich Zille, as well as other works by artists such as Theodor Alt, Albert Brendel, Ludwig Buchhorn, Carl Gustav Carus, Johan Christian Clausen Dahl, Anselm Feuerbach, Eduard Gaertner, Carl Graeb, Jakob Philipp Hackert, Karl Hagemeister, Johann Peter Hasenclever, Willy Jaeckel, Friedrich Kallmorgen, Max Klinger, Gerhard von Kügelgen, Wilhelm Leibl, Walter Leistikow, Friedrich Eduard Meyerheim, Paul Friedrich Meyerheim, Friedrich von Olivier, Ludwig Richter, Johann Gottfried Schadow, Karl Friedrich Schinkel, Franz Skarbina, Carl Steffeck, Wilhelm Trübner, Lesser Ury and Anton von Werner. Only two works came from non-German artists. These were pictures by the Belgians Jean-Baptiste Madou and Léon Mignon.

Hans Posse, Hitler's special representative for the so-called “Führermuseum” planned in Linz, wrote to Hitler's confidante Martin Bormann on 11 February 1942 about the Freund collection that it contained “excellent German romantics (especially CD Friedrich) and many masters from the early 19th century. Century like Krüger  It should be one of the last opportunities to expand the period of German painting in the first half of the 19th century. ”Despite the scarce foreign currency of the German Empire, Posse acquired from the Freund collection for the so-called“ Führermuseum “113 paintings and drawings valued at 62,581.80 francs. While the paintings mostly passed into the possession of the Federal Republic of Germany after the war, the 94 graphics came from the Weesenstein Castle depot as so-called looted art in the Soviet Union.

Swiss collectors and museums also purchased artworks from Freund Collection at the Fischer auction. The Kupferstichkabinett at the Kunstmuseum Basel acquired seven drawings by Blechen, Kollwitz, Liebermann, Marées and Menzel. The Kunsthaus Zürich also bought eight drawings from the collection. The Zurich collector Emil Georg Bührle bought works by Blechen, Carus, Gustav Adolf Friedrich, Hosemann, Krüger, Menzel and Slevogt from the auction. Before the auction, the collector Oskar Reinhart acquired a portrait of Caspar David Friedrich by Gerhard von Kügelgen directly from Fritz Nathan.

Claims and restitution 

It was only with the Washington Declaration of 1998 issued at the Washington Conference on Holocaust Era Assets that the heirs were able to obtain restitution of some works of art. In 2005 the Germany Advisory Commission ruled in favor of restitution, writing, "In 1939 Julius Freund and his wife, now penniless, emigrated to London because of the persecution measures of the Nazis.  After his death in 1941, Clara Freund found herself in 1942 forced for economic reasons to have the collection auctioned in Lucerne at the Galerie Fischer. The pictures mentioned were acquired there by Hans Posse, Hitler’s special commissioner for the development of the “Führer museum” in Linz. At the end of the war, the paintings were seized by the Allies, and as art works which at first could not be identified with their owner, were given as a loan by the German state to German museums.  Later they were displayed as lost art in the internet database www.lostart.de, in order by this means to find those with justified claims."In 2005, three paintings by Carl Blechen and a watercolor by Anselm Feuerbach, which had previously been on loan from the Federal Republic of Germany in various museums, were restituted to the Freund heirs. The watercolor The Funeral of the Court Jester by Anselm Feuerbach was previously in the Historical Museum of the Palatinate in Speyer, Blechen's painting Sleeping Faun in the Reeds in the Wallraf-Richartz Museum in Cologne, the painting Mühle im Tal (also mill in Saxon Switzerland) in the Electoral Palatinate Museum of the City of Heidelberg and Romantic Landscape with Ruin (also dawn - ruin) in the Westphalian State Museum in Münster. After restitution to the Freund heirs, Mill in a Valley was sold at Sothebys in 2009. The museum in Münster, which has since been renamed the LWL Museum for Art and Culture, was able to repurchase Blechen's painting from the heirs in 2010.

In 2020 the Saarland Cultural Heritage Foundation restituted several works by Max Slevogt to Freund's heirs who sold them back to the museum:

 Francisco d’An­drade (head study), 1902, oil on canvas
 Der Hafen von Brin­disi (Port of Brin­disi), 1914, watercolor
 Li-Hung-Tschang, 1900, ink draw­ing
 Scheherezade erzählt ihre Geschichte dem Kalifen (Scheherazade telling her sto­ries to the caliph), 1901, pen and ink draw­ing
 Mungos (Mongoose), 1901, watercolor pen and ink draw­ing
 Klagende Frauen (Klageweiber vor einem Haus) (Griev­ing wom­en [mourn­ers in front of a house]), around 1898–1903, pen and ink draw­ing

Literature 

 Galerie Fischer (Hrsg.): Sammlung Julius Freund, aus dem Besitz von Frau Dr. G. Freund, Buenos Aires, Gemälde, Aquarelle, Zeichnungen und Druckgraphik. Luzern 1942.
 Esther Tisa Francini, Anja Heuss, Georg Kreis: Fluchtgut – Raubgut. Chronos Verlag, Zürich 2001, .
 Birgit Schwarz: Hitlers Museum, die Fotoalben "Gemäldegalerie Linz", Dokumente zum "Führermuseum". Böhlau, Wien 2004, .

See also 

 List of claims for restitution for Nazi-looted art
 Sonderauftrag Linz

References 

1869 births
1941 deaths
People from Cottbus
People from the Province of Brandenburg
Jewish emigrants from Nazi Germany to the United Kingdom
Jewish art collectors
German art collectors
19th-century art collectors
20th-century art collectors
Jews and Judaism in Germany